Lake Wisconsin is a census-designated place (CDP) in Columbia and Sauk counties, in the towns of Lodi and Merrimac, in Wisconsin, United States. The population was 4,189 at the 2010 census.

The Columbia County portion of the Lake Wisconsin is part of the Madison Metropolitan Statistical Area, while the Sauk County portion is part of the Baraboo Micropolitan Statistical Area.

Geography
Lake Wisconsin is located at  (43.373461, -89.575676).

According to the United States Census Bureau, the CDP has a total area of 21.5 square miles (55.6 km2), of which, 12.1 square miles (31.4 km2) of it is land and 9.3 square miles (24.1 km2) of it (43.45%) is water.

Demographics
As of the census of 2000, there were 3,493 people, 1,419 households, and 1,082 families living in the CDP. The population density was 275.8 people per square mile (106.4/km2). There were 2,116 housing units at an average density of 167.0/sq mi (64.5/km2). The racial makeup of the CDP was 98.57% White, 0.14% African American, 0.43% Native American, 0.26% Asian, 0.14% from other races, and 0.46% from two or more races. Hispanic or Latino of any race were 0.54% of the population.

There were 1,419 households, out of which 30.3% had children under the age of 18 living with them, 70.1% were married couples living together, 3.7% had a female householder with no husband present, and 23.7% were non-families. 18.5% of all households were made up of individuals, and 6.4% had someone living alone who was 65 years of age or older. The average household size was 2.46 and the average family size was 2.81.

In the CDP, the population was spread out, with 22.5% under the age of 18, 4.8% from 18 to 24, 30.1% from 25 to 44, 30.8% from 45 to 64, and 11.8% who were 65 years of age or older. The median age was 40 years. For every 100 females, there were 108.7 males. For every 100 females age 18 and over, there were 107.5 males.

The median income for a household in the CDP was $58,906, and the median income for a family was $63,125. Males had a median income of $39,839 versus $28,229 for females. The per capita income for the CDP was $26,657. About 0.4% of families and 1.2% of the population were below the poverty line, including none of those under age 18 and 2.0% of those age 65 or over.

See also
 Lake Wisconsin AVA
 List of census-designated places in Wisconsin

References

External links

 Lodi & Lake Wisconsin Chamber of Commerce

Census-designated places in Columbia County, Wisconsin
Census-designated places in Sauk County, Wisconsin
Census-designated places in Wisconsin
Madison, Wisconsin, metropolitan statistical area